José Félix Evaristo de Uriburu y Álvarez de Arenales (November 19, 1831 – October 23, 1914) was President of Argentina from 23 January 1895 to 12 October 1898.

He was an adept diplomat; participating as arbiter on the peace negotiations on the War of the Pacific between Chile, Perú and Bolivia.

He was Vice-President and became President of Argentina in 1895 when Luis Sáenz Peña resigned.

His son was José Evaristo Uriburu y Tezanos Pinto (1880–1956), Argentinian Ambassador in London in the 1920s, and father of Clarita de Uriburu, Cecil Beaton's model.

Work in office as president
 Reformed the National Constitution in 1898.
 Created the National Lottery (Lotería Nacional de Beneficencia).
 Created the Museo Nacional de Bellas Artes Buenos Aires.
 Created the Otto Krause Technical School.

Other offices held
 Federal Judge, Salta (1872–1874)
 National Deputy (lower house of Congress)
 House President (1876–1877)
 Justice Minister under Bartolomé Mitre for a short time (1867).
 Senator for the City of Buenos Aires (1901–1910)

References 

Uriburu, José Evaristo
Uriburu, José Evaristo
People from Salta Province
Argentine people of Basque descent
Ambassadors of Argentina to Chile
Uriburu, José Evaristo
Uriburu, José Evaristo
Uriburu, José Evaristo
National Autonomist Party politicians
Burials at La Recoleta Cemetery
Presidents of the Argentine Chamber of Deputies
Members of the Argentine Senate for Salta
Members of the Argentine Chamber of Deputies elected in Salta
Ministers of Justice of Argentina
Patrician families of Buenos Aires